The Racine Raiders is a semi-professional American football club in the Mid-States Football League, based in Racine, Wisconsin. The team plays in the Gridiron Developmental Football League (GDFL).

Founded in 1953, they are the oldest minor league football team still operating in Wisconsin. They own a total of nine national titles. The Raiders were the first minor league football team to gain 501(c)(3) Not-For-Profit status from the Internal Revenue Service (IRS). The organization is composed entirely of volunteers. The helmet design is a silver background with a cowboy bandit in black with an eye patch on the left eye with a half and half bandanna of cardinal and black.

Staff
President:  Matt Nelson
General Manager:  Robbie Harrington
Head Coach:  Wilbert Kennedy

Franchise history

Summary
William "Wigs" Konicek, a graduate of Horlick High School and local restaurateur, started the Racine Raiders in 1953. The team began in the Bi-States Football League (BSFL) and won their first league championship in 1954.

The team was able to sustain itself until 1975 when it disbanded. Although they did not field a team for the 1976 and 1977 season, they remained organized for those seasons. New owners started the Racine Gladiators in 1978. They paid players and were successful on the field, winning three National Championships. Unfortunately, the team fell on hard times and disbanded in 1985.

In 1986, Bob Milkie, a retired bearing company executive, Joe Mooney, a police sergeant, Jess Levin, a local banker, and others rebuilt the team, this time as community-owned, non-profit organization.

Perhaps the biggest moment in the team's history, as well as that of minor league football, came in 1989 when the team traveled to Ottawa, Canada, to play in a World Championship game. While the team won the game in five degree weather and a blizzard, just playing the game was the important element. The team was now able to apply for, and received, 501(c)3 Not-For-Profit status from the Internal Revenue Service, setting the tone for dozens of minor league football teams since to be able to do the same.

The Raiders have won nine National Championships and have had nearly a dozen players with National Football League (NFL) experience. They also have 31 players, coaches or staff in the American Football Association (AFA) Semi Pro Hall of Fame, more than any other team.

American Football Association (AFA) Minor League Football Hall of Fame

Minor League Football News Hall of Fame

Retired numbers

Players that played professional outdoor football

 Danny Crooks - Atlanta Falcons (1971)
 Ron Daugherty - Minnesota Vikings (1987)
 Don Deerwester - Chicago/Bloomfield Cardinals (1947)
 Greg Dubinetz -  Cincinnati Bengals (1975), Charlotte Hornets (1975), British Columbia Lions (1977), New York Giants (1977), Toronto Argonauts (1976, 1978), Washington Redskins (1979), Hamilton Tiger-Cats (1980)
 Jim Haluska - Chicago Bears, Cleveland Browns (1956) 
 Tony Lombardo - Philadelphia Eagles (1964)
 Brian Lindstrom -  Buffalo Bills (1972) 
 Phil Micech - Minnesota Vikings (1987)
 Brent Moss - St. Louis Rams (1995)
 Don Perkins - Green Bay Packers (1943–1945), Chicago Bears (1945–1946)
 Tim Rucks - New York Jets (1983)
 Dave Smith (fullback) -  Houston Oilers (1960–1964) Sporting News All-AFL in 1960. Member of AFL's first two championship teams in 1960 and 1961.
Ralph Thomas -  Chicago Cardinals (1952), Washington Redskins (1955–1956)
 Matt Turk - Washington Redskins (1995–99), Miami Dolphins (2000–01, 2003–05), New York Jets (2002), St. Louis Rams (2006), Houston Texans (2007–2010;2011), Jacksonville Jaguars (2011).
 Fred Venturelli - Chicago Bears (1948)
 Adam Walker - Minnesota Vikings (1987)
 Kevin Webster - Minnesota Vikings (1987) 
 Brett Wilson - Minnesota Vikings (1987)

Head coaches

References

Further reading
Racine Raiders Join GDFL
The Milwaukee Sentinel – Google News Archive Search
JSOnline.com News Archives 
Men young and old chase football dreams at Racine Raiders tryout
Raiders leave NAFL for MidStates Football League
Racine Raiders don't find the answer
Racine’s Horlick Athletic Field: Drums Along the Foundries

External links
 
 Play for the Raiders—Racine Raiders official recruiting website

Sports in Racine, Wisconsin
American football teams in Wisconsin
Sports in Milwaukee
American football teams established in 1953
Semi-professional American football
1953 establishments in Wisconsin
Viking Age in popular culture